The Little Falls Mets were a minor league baseball team located in Little Falls, New York.  The team played in the New York–Penn League, and were affiliated with the New York Mets.  Their home stadium was Little Falls Veterans Memorial Park.

Notable players

Famous Little Falls Mets alumni include:

 Shawn Abner – 1st overall baseball amateur draft pick in 1984
 Rick Aguilera – former Major League relief pitcher
 Wally Backman – former Major League second baseman and manager
 Billy Beane – former Major League outfielder and current Oakland A's general manager
 Kevin Elster – former Major League shortstop
 Dwight Gooden – former Major League pitcher
 Todd Hundley – - former Major League catcher
 Lloyd McClendon – former Major League player and manager
 J. P. Ricciardi – former Toronto Blue Jays general manager

References

External links
Photographs of Veterans Memorial Park, former home of the Little Falls Mets – Rochester Area Ballparks

Baseball teams established in 1977
Baseball teams disestablished in 1988
Defunct minor league baseball teams
Defunct New York–Penn League teams
Defunct baseball teams in New York (state)
New York Mets minor league affiliates
1977 establishments in New York (state)
1988 disestablishments in New York (state)